Sidharth Sengupta is an Indian television director, writer and roducer. His directing career includes Balika Vadhu on Colors and 26/11 on Life Ok. He has produced, directed and written web series like Apharan (web series) on Alt Balaji, Undekhi on SonyLIV and Yeh Kaali Kaali Ankhein on Netflix.

Personal life 
He married Sujata Sengupta on 21 February 1992. The couple has a son, Shivam Sengupta, who is a singer.

Filmography

Films
Good Luck Jerry (2022)

Television 
Tanha
9 Malabar Hill (Producer)
Balika Vadhu
Radha Ki Betiyaan kuch kardhikhayengi
Saakshi
Rangrasiya
Kehta hain Dil Jee le zara
Tum Saath ho Jab Apne
D4- Get Up and Dance
Meri Bhabhi
Jyoti
Godh Bharai
Chabbis Barah (26/12)
Dil Sambhal Jaa Zara (Producer)
Aap Joh Bole Haan toh Haan (Producer)
Un Hazaaron Ke Naam
Ek Chabbi Hain Pados Mein
Karishma: A Miracle of Destiny

Web series
Apharan (Writer/Producer/Director)
Undekhi (Writer/Producer/Director)
Yeh Kaali Kaali Ankhein (Writer/producer/Director)
Aar Ya Paar (web series) (Writer/producer/Director)

References

External links 

 

Indian television directors
Year of birth missing (living people)
Living people